Jashar Mezenxhiu was an Albanian politician and mayor of Tirana from 1984 to 1985.

References

Year of birth missing
Year of death missing
Mayors of Tirana